Cal or CAL may refer to:

Arts and entertainment 
 Cal (novel), a 1983 novel by Bernard MacLaverty
 "Cal" (short story), a science fiction short story by Isaac Asimov
 Cal (1984 film), an Irish drama starring John Lynch and Helen Mirren
 Cal (album), the soundtrack album by Mark Knopfler
 Cal (2013 film), a British drama
 Judge Cal, a fictional character in the Judge Dredd comic strip in 2000 AD

Aviation 
 Cal Air International, an airline based in the United Kingdom
 Campbeltown Airport IATA airport code
 China Airlines ICAO airline code
 Continental Airlines, an American airline with the New York Stock Exchange symbol of "CAL"
 CAL Cargo Air Lines, a cargo airline based in Israel

Organizations and businesses 
 CAL Bank, a commercial bank in Ghana
 Cal Yachts, originally the Jensen Marine Corporation, founded in 1957
 Center for Applied Linguistics, a non-profit organization that researches language and culture
 Cercle artistique de Luxembourg, an artist association in Luxembourg
 Coalition of African Lesbians, a non-profit organisation based in South Africa
 Colorado Association of Libraries, professional association in Colorado
 Copyright Agency Ltd, an Australian copyright agency

People 
 Cal (given name), a list of people
 Cal (surname), a list of people
 Cal (footballer) (born 1996), Brazilian footballer
 John Calipari (born 1959), American basketball coach often called "Coach Cal" or "Cal"

Places 
 a short form of the state of California
 Cal Islet, in the Madeira Islands Archipelago of Portugal
 Çal, a district and town in southwest Turkey

School-related 
 University of California, Berkeley, often shortened to "Cal"
 California Golden Bears, UC Berkeley's intercollegiate athletic program

Science and math 
 Calanthe, an orchid genus abbreviated cal. in horticulture
 Calcium hydroxide, also called cal
 Caliber, firearm barrel measurement
 abbreviation for calorie, a unit of energy
 Cold Atom Laboratory, an instrument to research Bose-Einstein Condensates on the International Space Station

Software 
 C/AL, a programming language used with Microsoft Dynamics NAV
 Cakewalk Application Language, a scripting language used with Cakewalk Pro Audio software
 CAL Actor Language, a dataflow language
 Cal (application), a former calendar app by Any.do
 cal (command), a program on various operating systems that prints an ASCII calendar of the given month or year
 CAL (programming language), a programming language based on JOSS
 Client access license, operating systems and software license scheme
 Cray Assembly Language, included with the Cray Operating System

Sports 
 Cape Ann League, a high school athletic conference in Massachusetts, United States
 Cape-Atlantic League, a high school athletic conference in New Jersey, United States
 Cyberathlete Amateur League, online electronic sports league

Other uses 
 Calipatria State Prison, California, United States
 Capital allocation line, a graph to measure risk
 Carolinian language ISO 639-3 code
 FN CAL, an assault rifle made by the Belgian firm FN (Fabrique Nationale)
 Cincinnati Academic League, a high school quiz bowl league

See also

CALS (disambiguation)